Baghcheh (also Romanized as Bāghcheh; also known as Bāghcheh Bozorg) is a village in Il Teymur Rural District, in the Central District of Bukan County, West Azerbaijan Province, Iran. At the 2006 census, its population was 399, in 70 families.

References 

Populated places in Bukan County